Lynn George Stiles (born April 12, 1941) is a former American football player, coach, and executive. He served as the head football coach at San Jose State University from 1976 to 1978, compiling a record of 18–16. Stiles was later an assistant coach with the Philadelphia Eagles, San Francisco 49ers and St. Louis Rams of the National Football League (NFL). From 1992 to 1996, he served in the front office for the Kansas City Chiefs as vice president of player personnel.

Stiles played college football at the University of Utah as a guard, center, and linebacker.

Head coaching record

References

External links
 Kansas City Chiefs profile

1941 births
Living people
American football centers
American football guards
American football linebackers
Iowa Hawkeyes football coaches
Kansas City Chiefs executives
Philadelphia Eagles coaches
San Francisco 49ers coaches
San Jose State Spartans football coaches
St. Louis Rams coaches
St. Louis Rams executives
UCLA Bruins football coaches
Utah Utes football coaches
Utah Utes football players
People from Kermit, Texas
Coaches of American football from Texas
Players of American football from Texas